Myladi may refer to:

 Myladi, Kerala, India
 Myladi, Tamil Nadu, India